In mathematics, Matsumotos's theorem, named for Hideya Matsumoto, may refer to:
Matsumoto's theorem (group theory)
Matsumoto's theorem (K-theory)